Mukund Nagar is an area    near Swargate, situated in the inner parts of Pune, Maharashtra, India. The name 'Mukund Nagar' is given to this area because the whole land was owned by late Mukund Lohiya. He donated the land to then government to construct houses for the flood affected residents in Pune when Panshet Dam bursted on 12 July 1961 and the life in Pune was devastated.

It is mainly a residential area having housing complexes such as DSK Chandradeep, Sujay Garden, Laxmi Vilas and many individual bungalow plots. The Sujay Garden Commercial complex house many shops ranging from apparel to car part stores. Another popular landmark is the Brand Factory Mall. For medical aid, Ranka Hospital and other clinics and dispensaries can be found it. This area is also known for its poshness because the price of flats has risen up rapidly in this area.

Neighbourhoods in Pune